The Aviation Islands are a group of small rocky islands lying  north of Cape Kinsey and the Wilson Hills. They were mapped by the Soviet Antarctic Expedition, 1958, and named Ostrova Polyarnoy Aviatsii ("Polar Aviation Islands"). The feature is the site of an Adélie penguin rookery.

See also 

 List of Antarctic and sub-Antarctic islands

References
 

Islands of Oates Land